Martha Evens is an emeritus professor at the Illinois Institute of Technology. She worked on the first spelling correction program at MIT Lincoln Laboratory in the late 1950s. Evens was president of the Association for Computational Linguistics in 1984.

Biography
Martha Evens graduated summa from Bryn Mawr College in 1955 with a major in Math, having taken many courses in Greek. She shared the European Fellowship (with Nancy Degenhardt, Greek major). Evens was president of the classics club and played field hockey and basketball for the college.

Her first interaction with a computer was in the summer of 1957 when she received an M.A. in mathematics from Radcliffe College and was hired as a "Mathematician" by Oliver Selfridge at MIT Lincoln Laboratory. That computer was an IBM 709, which became a 7090 when Evens went back to Lincoln Laboratory in the summer of 1958. She did take a class in FORTRAN II using the first FORTRAN compiler shipped by IBM in 1958.

Evens completed her Ph.D. in computer science from Northwestern University in 1975. Subsequently, she became a member of the Computer Science faculty at Illinois Institute of Technology, where she remained. During her career at IIT, Evens served as advisor or co-advisor of over 100 PhD students.

"I also drove the two boxes of cards containing the first Lisp Interpreter from MIT to Lincoln Lab as a favor to a friend - and only later realized what a big part Lisp was to play in my life and work," Dr. Evens said.

Books

References

External links 

1935 births
Living people
Illinois Institute of Technology faculty
American computer scientists
Radcliffe College alumni
Northwestern University alumni
MIT Lincoln Laboratory people
Bryn Mawr College alumni